Midgets vs. Mascots is a 2010 mockumentary film. It is notable for being the last film Gary Coleman made before his death in May 2010.

Plot

Ten contestants consisting of five little people and five mascots compete for ten million dollars in prize money.

Cast

Gary Coleman
Scottie Pippen
Jason Mewes
Ron Jeremy
Akie Kotabe
Richard Howland
Mark Hapka
Brittney Powell
Paul Rae
Russell
Bob Bledsoe
Kayla Carlyle
Joe Gnoffo
Josh Sussman
Leamone
Richard Trapp
P.J. Marino
Terra Jole
Steve Krieger
Laura Pippen
Preston Pippen
Justin Pippen
Tava Smiley
Amanda Durbin
Victoria Hines
Normita Joven
Jacqueline Kradin
Jean Claude Kradin
Sasha Snow
Annette Algoso
Gabriel D. Angell
Geoffrey Betts
Donny Boaz
Tyler Brockington
Stephen Brodie
James Burleson
Jenna Burris
Kimberly Lynn Campbell
Craig Cole
Skai Dabney
Brian Dakota
Phillip-Charlie Daniell
Gerardo Davila
Jill Deramus
Gary Eoff
Nathan Fane
Joe Francis
Jayk Gallagher
Ryan Gunn
Robert Hayes
Christopher Holt
Kevin Holt
Nicole Holt
Mario Jimenez
Michael S. Koenig
Sunny Lane
William Lanier
Lon Lawson
Tiffany McManus
Mario Mims
Kylie Moro
François Nguyen
Nic Novicki
Jack O'Donnell
Liam Owen
Asa Patrick
Collin Patrick
Heda Patrick
Ian Patrick
Laurel Penn
Jordan Prentice
Lindsey Rayl
Rhonda Reeves
Reece Rios
Ryan Daniel Rodriguez
Scott Roland
Brandy Schaefer
Andrew Sensenig
Mehul Shah
Juanita Stone
Preston Strother
Anna Elisabeth Taylor
James Michael Taylor
Lianna Taylor
Stephen Monroe Taylor
Shain E. Thomas
Drew Rin Varick
Cha'liya Vertison
Tamara Voss
Austin Walker
Drew Waters
Farah White
Steven Whitemon
Joshua Wilkins
Morgane Wood

Reception

The movie had  a mostly negative reception from critics.

References

2009 direct-to-video films
2009 films
2000s English-language films